Yorgo Constantine Yfantopoulos is an American-Greek actor who began his career in 1991 with the television movie Murder 101. Following that he had several roles in both film and television, such as in Beverly Hills, 90210 (1998), Phone Booth (2002), Resurrection Blvd. (2002), Live Free or Die Hard (2007), Fast Five (2011), and Parallels (2015).

Biography 
Yorgo Constantine grew up in Lower Manhattan, New York City. He lived part of his early life in the Greenwich Village neighborhood, and later moved to the Tribeca neighborhood. Though he identifies as an American, his father is from the Pangrati area of Athens, Greece.

Though Constantine originally aspired to work a career playing professional tennis, he grew interested instead in acting while attending New York University, where he decided to pursue acting professionally. At nineteen or twenty years old, Constantine was brought to Los Angeles, a move he credits for allowing him to go on to act in big Hollywood movies; otherwise, he "probably would have stayed in New York City."

Filmography
Highlights of his productions include:

Film

Television

Video Games

References

External links
 

American male film actors
American male television actors
American people of Greek descent